Praveen Thakur (born 15 December 1992) is an Indian cricketer. He made his first-class debut for Himachal Pradesh in the 2018–19 Ranji Trophy on 6 December 2018. He made his List A debut on 1 March 2021, for Himachal Pradesh in the 2020–21 Vijay Hazare Trophy.

References

External links
 

1992 births
Living people
Indian cricketers
Himachal Pradesh cricketers
Place of birth missing (living people)